B98 may refer to :
 B98, a postcode district in the B postcode area
 Sicilian Defence, Najdorf Variation, according to the list of chess openings
 Lola B98/10, a Le Mans Prototype
 B98 FM, the former name of Classic Hits FM, a radio station in Christchurch, New Zealand
 KZBB, a commercial radio station located in Poteau, Oklahoma, broadcasting to the Fort Smith, Arkansas, area